W.A.K.O. European Championships 2012 in Bucharest were the joint twenty-three European kickboxing championships held by the W.A.K.O. organization arranged by the Romanian Full-Contact Martial Arts Federation (F.R.A.M.C.) president Dorel Bulearcă. The first event was held the previous month in Ankara, Turkey. It was the first W.A.K.O. event to be held in Bucharest and Romania and involved over 550 amateur men and women from 35 countries across Europe.

There were four styles on offer at Bucharest: Full-Contact, Semi-Contact, Light-Contact and Musical Forms. Only one competitor per weight division were allowed to participate in the first three, while Musical Forms was allowed two maximum per country.

The top nation by the end of the championships was Russia, with Italy in second and Hungary in third. The winners of the Full-Contact and Semi-Contact events qualified for the World Combat Games 2013.

The event was held over five days at the Polyvalent Hall in Bucharest, Romania, starting on Tuesday, 27 November and ending on Saturday, 1 December 2012.

Full-Contact

Full-Contact is a form of kickboxing where the contestants can throw punches and kicks with full power at legal targets above the waist. Victories are usually gained via a point's decision or by referee stoppage and as with most other forms of amateur kickboxing, various head and body protection must be worn.

Men's Full-Contact Kickboxing Medals Table

Women's Full-Contact Kickboxing Medals Table

Semi-Contact

Semi-Contact is the least physical of the contact kickboxing styles available at W.A.K.O. events. It involves the participants throwing controlled strikes at targets above the waist, with point's scored on the basis of speed and technique with power prohibited.  Despite the less physical nature all contestants must wear head and various body protection.

Men's Semi-Contact Kickboxing Medals Table

Women's Semi-Contact Kickboxing Medals Table

Team's Semi-Contact Kickboxing Medals Table

Light-Contact

Light-Contact is a form of kickboxing that is less physical than Full-Contact but more so than Semi-Contact and is often seen as a transition between the two. Contestants score points on the basis of speed and technique over brute force although stoppages can occur, although as with other amateur forms head and body protection must be worn. Unfortunately, it is often in the shadow of the full contact styles.

Men's Light-Contact Kickboxing Medals Table

Women's Light-Contact Kickboxing Medals Table

Musical Forms

Musical Forms is a type of non-physical competition which sees the contestants fighting against imaginary foes using Martial Arts techniques. Unlike Full, Semi and Light-Contact kickboxing there were no weight divisions, only male and female competitions and competitors were allowed to compete in more than one category with some countries having than one athlete in each category. The men and women at Bucharest competed in four different styles explained below:

Hard Styles – coming from Karate and Taekwondo. 
Soft Styles – coming from Kung Fu and Wu-Sha. 
Hard Styles with Weapons – using weapons such as Kama, Sai, Tonfa, Nunchaku, Bō, Katana. 
Soft Styles with Weapons - using weapons such as Naginata, Nunchaku, Tai Chi Chuan Sword, Whip Chain.

Men's Musical Forms Medals Table

Women's Musical Forms Medals Table

Medal table

See also
List of WAKO Amateur European Championships
List of WAKO Amateur World Championships
List of male kickboxers
List of female kickboxers

References

External links
 WAKO World Association of Kickboxing Organizations Official Site
 BUCHAREST EC: ALL OFFICIALS RESULTS, POOLS AND MEDALS TABLE

WAKO Amateur European Championships events
2012 in kickboxing
Sports competitions in Bucharest
Kickboxing in Romania
2012 in Romanian sport